Valerie Demey (born 17 January 1994) is a Belgian professional racing cyclist, who currently rides for UCI Women's WorldTeam . She was among the many openly LGBT athletes who competed at the 2020 Summer Olympics.

Major results 
2016
 10th Erondegemse Pijl
2017
 4th Dwars door de Westhoek
 6th Flanders Diamond Tour
 6th Time trial, National Road Championships
2018
 2nd Road race, National Road Championships
 9th Grand Prix International d'Isbergues
 9th Overall Omloop van het Hageland
2019
 8th Postnord UCI WWT Vårgårda West Sweden TTT
 9th Mixed team relay, Road World Championships
2020
 6th Grote Prijs Euromat
 8th Time trial, National Road Championships
2021
 7th Omloop van de Westhoek
 9th Dwars door de Westhoek
 10th Overall Thüringen Ladies Tour
2022
 8th Omloop van het Hageland

See also
 List of 2016 UCI Women's Teams and riders

References

External links
 
 
 
 
 

1994 births
Living people
Belgian female cyclists
Sportspeople from Bruges
Cyclists from West Flanders
Olympic cyclists of Belgium
Cyclists at the 2020 Summer Olympics
Belgium LGBT sportspeople
21st-century Belgian women